Kevin Reilly is an American former professional football player with the Philadelphia Eagles, author, motivational speaker, amputee and former broadcaster for the Philadelphia Eagles Network.

NFL career
Reilly was originally drafted from Villanova by the Miami Dolphins in 1973 in the seventh round, although later that year he returned to his Wilmington, Delaware home and joined the Philadelphia Eagles, serving as captain of the squad's special teams for two seasons before ending his career with the New England Patriots.

Cancer

In 1976, shortly after beginning his NFL career, Reilly was diagnosed with a rare scar tissue tumor known as desmoid tumor. This effectively ended his career in football. He then underwent multiple surgeries that were unsuccessful in curing the cancer, ultimately undergoing an 11 1/2 hour surgery in 1979 at Memorial Sloan Kettering to remove his left arm, shoulder, and five ribs. Recovery from surgery as an amputee was difficult and Reilly suffered significant depression but was able to overcome it at least in part due to the support of another NFL player who overcame similar physical trauma from injury in the Vietnam War, Rocky Bleier.

Post cancer life

After surgery, Reilly worked hard at rehabilitation to overcome the limitations the experts said he would have. He learned to tie a necktie with one hand, to play golf with one hand, and ran five half marathons and in the Marine Corps Marathon.

He went on to a 30-year career with Xerox and now, having retired from corporate America, is a sports radio broadcaster, appearing on Eagles' pregame and postgame shows. He is also a motivational speaker, sharing his story with corporate audiences, business leaders, cancer patients, recuperating soldiers, and special needs students. Reilly also counseled victims of the Boston Marathon Bombings.

In 2015, Reilly was announced as the color analyst for the Villanova Wildcats football radio team on WTEL (AM).

In 2018, Kevin Reilly, along with John Riley, wrote the book "Tackling Life: How Faith, Family and Fortitude Kept an NFL Linebacker in the Game."

References

External links
 Kevin Reilly – Motivational Speaker, Former NFL Player, Amputee & Cancer Survivor

1951 births
Living people
American football linebackers
Villanova Wildcats football players
Philadelphia Eagles players
New England Patriots players
Players of American football from Wilmington, Delaware
Salesianum School alumni